Mimeugnosta particeps is a species of moth of the family Tortricidae. It is found in Honduras and on Cuba.

References

Moths described in 1986
Cochylini